"Tuttle" is an episode from the television series M*A*S*H. It was the 15th episode broadcast and aired on January 14, 1973. It was written by Bruce Shelly and David Ketchum and directed by William Wiard. This episode was nominated for a Writers Guild Award.

Guest cast is Dennis Fimple as Sergeant "Sparky" Pryor, Mary-Robin Redd as Sister Theresa, Herb Voland as Brigadier General Crandell Clayton, and James Sikking as a finance officer.

Overview 
To create a way of diverting camp supplies to the local orphanage, Hawkeye and Trapper invent the fictional Captain Tuttle (based on Hawkeye's imaginary friend from childhood). With Radar's help, the doctors add more layers to their creation (such as a fake personnel file), and the deception slowly grows until nearly everyone at the 4077th believes Tuttle is a real person. The situation ultimately climaxes when they obtain Tuttle's back pay—fourteen months' worth—and donate it and Tuttle's future pay to the orphanage. However, matters threaten to spiral out of control when General Clayton decides to award Tuttle a medal for his actions. Hawkeye ends the problem by faking Tuttle's death, stating that he had heroically jumped into a combat zone without his parachute, and claiming that the orphanage is the sole beneficiary of the fictional doctor's GI insurance. As the episode ends, the Swampmen joke with each other about where they got a pair of dog tags they used to authenticate Tuttle's death—from the equally fictional Major Murdock.

Captain Tuttle is a parody of Lieutenant Kijé, the subject of a novella by Soviet author Yury Tynyanov. Kijé, who existed only on paper, was  supposedly a soldier in the Czar's army. As with Captain Tuttle, the paperwork edifice begins to collapse when Lieutenant Kijé must make a personal appearance. The novella was made into a film, famous for its music by Sergei Prokofiev.

This is the only episode of the series in which the normally unseen character of Sparky actually appears.

In the closing credits, "Captain Tuttle" is credited as playing himself.

References 

1973 American television episodes
M*A*S*H (season 1) episodes